Perttu Päivö Kullervo Kivilaakso (born May 11, 1978) is a cello player for Finnish band Apocalyptica. Like fellow band members Eicca Toppinen and Paavo Lötjönen, he attended Sibelius Academy in Helsinki. He plays a German 19th century cello; he started playing the cello when he was 5 years old and joined Apocalyptica for their third studio album Cult. Kivilaakso played in Apocalyptica's 1995 line up, but he was concentrating on his studies when the band began their professional career. At the end of 1999 he came back, switching places with Antero Manninen, who then went to play in a classical orchestra.

Career
Kivilaakso won third place in the second International Paulo Cello Competition in 1996 at age 18. Shortly afterward, he attained a lifetime chair in the Helsinki Philharmonic orchestra, where his father, Juhani, is also a cellist. He was on indefinite leave while touring with Apocalyptica, but left for good in 2007.

Kivilaakso has also composed music for the video game Max Payne 2: The Fall of Max Payne, a few documentary films, as well as many original compositions for Apocalyptica, including "Conclusion," "Farewell" and "Beautiful."

His first opera, composed with his Apocalyptica bandmate Eicca Toppinen, was premiered at the Finnish National Opera on 22 January 2016. The opera, entitled Indigo, tells "a story of an omnipotent, multinational company and a search for happiness."

Personal life
As of late 2019, Kivilaakso was living with his wife and a dog. They have no children.

References

External links 

20th-century Finnish composers
20th-century Finnish male musicians
21st-century Finnish composers
21st-century Finnish male musicians
Apocalyptica members
Finnish classical cellists
Finnish heavy metal cellists
Finnish male composers
Finnish opera composers
Living people
Male opera composers
Musicians from Helsinki
Sibelius Academy alumni
Year of birth missing (living people)